Raven-Symoné Christina Pearman-Maday ( or  , née Pearman; born December 10, 1985), also known mononymously as Raven, is an American actress, singer, and songwriter. She has received several accolades, including five NAACP Image Awards, two Kids' Choice Awards, three Young Artist Awards, and three Daytime Emmy Award nominations. In 2012, she was included on VH1's list of  "100 Greatest Child Stars of All Time".

Raven-Symoné began her career as a child actress, appearing as Olivia Kendall on The Cosby Show (1989–1992) and Nicole Lee on Hangin' with Mr. Cooper (1993–1997), both of which earned her a number of awards and nominations. When she was 15 years old, she landed a role of Raven Baxter on the Disney Channel television series That's So Raven (2003–2007), for which she was nominated for numerous accolades. Her film credits include Dr. Dolittle (1998), its sequel Dr. Dolittle 2 (2001), The Princess Diaries 2 (2004), and College Road Trip (2008), which were all box office successes. Her television film credits include Zenon: Girl of the 21st Century (1999), its second sequel Zenon: Z3 (2004), The Cheetah Girls (2003), its sequel The Cheetah Girls 2 (2006), For One Night (2006), and Revenge of the Bridesmaids (2010). Raven-Symoné has also lent her voice to the animated series Kim Possible for the character Monique, and films such as Tinker Bell (2008). Raven-Symoné has reprised her role as Raven Baxter on Raven's Home (2017–present), for which she was nominated for the Daytime Emmy Award for Outstanding Performer in Children's Programming.

In music, Raven-Symoné released her debut studio album at the age of seven, Here's to New Dreams (1993), which saw the moderate commercial success of the single "That's What Little Girls Are Made Of". Her subsequent studio albums, Undeniable (1999), This Is My Time (2004), and Raven-Symoné (2008) saw some commercial success on the Billboard 200 chart in the United States. She also contributed vocals to several soundtracks from her Disney projects, including The Cheetah Girls (2003), That's So Raven (2004), That's So Raven Too! (2006), and The Cheetah Girls 2 (2006), several of which were certified platinum and gold. She was also a co-host of the ABC daytime talk show The View from 2015 to 2016. She will host and executive produce the new reality show What Not to Design.

Early life
Raven-Symoné was born in Atlanta, Georgia, to Lydia (Gaulden) and Christopher Pearman. She has a younger brother, Blaize. As an infant, she worked for Atlanta's Young Faces Inc. modelling agency and was featured in local print advertisements. At the age of two, she worked with Ford Models in New York City and appeared in ads for Ritz crackers, Jell-O, Fisher-Price, and Cool Whip. At age three, her family moved to Ossining, New York, where she attended Park School.

Career

Acting

1989–2002: Early work 
In 1989, Raven-Symoné auditioned for a role in the Bill Cosby movie, Ghost Dad. At the age of three, she was considered too young for the role, but Cosby liked her so much that he found a role for her on his show, The Cosby Show, as his step-granddaughter Olivia. She made her debut in the premiere episode of the show's sixth season and remained until the series finale in 1992. She then appeared as the younger version of Halle Berry's starring character, a headstrong biracial enslaved woman, in the TV movie Alex Haley's Queen, based on the book Queen: The Story of an American Family written by Alex Haley.

In 1993, one year after The Cosby Show ended, Raven-Symoné landed the role of Nicole Lee on the show Hangin' with Mr. Cooper. She made her debut in the first episode of the show's second season and remained until the series finale in 1997. In 1994, during her time on the show Hangin' with Mr. Cooper, she had her first film role in The Little Rascals, playing Stymie's girlfriend. The Little Rascals earned $67.3 million worldwide during its theatrical run.

In 1998, she was cast in the Eddie Murphy comedy Dr. Dolittle, as Charisse Dolittle, the oldest daughter of Murphy's character. Dr. Dolittle earned $294.5 million worldwide during its theatrical run. In 1999, she appeared in Zenon: Girl of the 21st Century as Nebula, her first production under Disney.

In 2001, she reprised the role of Charisse Dolittle in the sequel Eddie Murphy comedy Dr. Dolittle 2. Dr. Dolittle 2 earned $176.1 million worldwide during its theatrical run. In the same year, she participated in two episodes of the comedy series, My Wife and Kids as Charmaine, Claire's pregnant friend, her first production under ABC.

2003–2007: Breakthrough with Disney 
In 2001, Raven-Symoné auditioned for a role on an upcoming series for the Disney Channel titled Absolutely Psychic, about a teenager with psychic abilities. She actually auditioned for the recurring role of Chelsea Daniels, but her role was changed to the lead character Raven Baxter and the series name changed to That's So Raven. The series debuted on January 17, 2003, and ended on November 10, 2007, becoming responsible for many firsts for Disney Channel including becoming the channel's highest-rated and longest-running series at 100 episodes (until it was surpassed by Wizards of Waverly Place in October 2011). The title character draws on her talent, ingenuity, psychic powers, and a variety of disguises to get in and out of amusing adolescent and pre-adolescent situations. It spawned a franchise including soundtracks, dolls, episode DVDs, and video games. That's So Raven was nominated for Outstanding Children's Program during the 2005 and 2007 Emmy Awards. That's So Raven, was the first Disney Channel series to have four seasons and 100 episodes. Merchandise has earned to date $400 million. The show also launched the channel's first spin-off series, Cory in the House.

In 2002, Raven-Symoné was given the voice role of Monique on Kim Possible as the best friend of Kim Possible. She had a recurring role, as she was featured in all seasons of the show, and participated in the two films for the series, Kim Possible: A Sitch in Time (2003) and Kim Possible: So the Drama (2005).

In 2003, she starred as lead singer Galleria Garibaldi in The Cheetah Girls, a Disney Channel Original Movie about four city girls who dream of becoming superstars. The film was the channel's first musical and was the basis for another franchise, including dolls, video games, and platinum-selling soundtracks. The film also starred Adrienne Bailon as Chanel Simmons, Sabrina Bryan as Dorinda Thomas, and Kiely Williams as Aquanette Walker. The film was directed by Oz Scott, and produced by Grammy-winner Whitney Houston. It attracted more than 6.5 million viewers opening night, making it (at the time) Disney Channel's most-watched movie and highest-rated Disney Channel broadcast of 2003. The film soundtrack, The Cheetah Girls, debuted at No. 33 on the Billboard Top 200 and is certified for Double Platinum sales by the RIAA for sales of 2 million copies. It was the second-best-selling soundtrack of 2004, behind Shrek.
In 2004, during her time on the show That's So Raven, she provided the voice of Danielle in the movie Fat Albert. It had a moderate performance at the box office, earning $48,551,322 worldwide during its theatrical run. She made an appearance in The Princess Diaries 2: Royal Engagement as Princess Asana, during which she sang a duet with Julie Andrews. It was her first film with Walt Disney Pictures and it earned $134.7 million worldwide during its theatrical run. In the Disney Channel Original Movie, Zenon: Z3, Raven-Symoné reprised her role as Nebula Wade. It had over 1.3 million viewers the night it premiered. The same year, after the unexpected success of the film and its soundtrack, a TV show based on The Cheetah Girls was pitched to the ABC network. It was never picked up as a series due to Raven-Symoné not being able to be in two series at the same time.

In 2006, she starred in the drama For One Night, which was based on a true story. Its premiere was on February 6, 2006, with the station Lifetime Movie Network. She portrayed the role of Briana McCallister, inspired by the true story of a black teenager who shook up a small town where high school proms had been racially segregated for decades. During this time, she also disengaged from the Disney Channel. In the same year, she continued her role in The Cheetah Girls 2, The film was directed by Kenny Ortega and produced by Grammy-winner Whitney Houston. She served as executive producer of the film. The film brought in more than 8 million viewers opening night, making it (at the time) Disney Channel's most-watched movie and highest-rated Disney Channel program of the year 2006. She starred in the Disney Channel Crossover Episode That's So Suite Life of Hannah Montana alongside Miley Cyrus, Dylan Sprouse and Cole Sprouse. Later that year, she provided her voice for Marti Brewster in, Everyone's Hero, which was distributed by 20th Century Fox, and released theatrically on September 15, 2006. Everyone's Hero had a moderate performance at the box office, earning only $16 million worldwide during its theatrical run, but the film was not released in several major countries.

2008–2011: Leading film roles 
In 2008, The Cheetah Girls: One World began production, however Raven-Symoné did not return for the final film in The Cheetah Girls series. While "catfights" and "territorial issues" were initially stated to be the reason, Symoné revealed that she did not appear in the third film due to feeling "excluded" and "ostracized" on the set of the second film, likely due to the fact that the three other girls had spent so much time together after being put together in the real-life Cheetah Girls recording group.

In 2008, she starred in her first leading role. The comedy College Road Trip surrounds Melanie Porter a 17-year-old college-bound girl who is eagerly looking forward to her first big step towards independence, when she plans a girls-only road trip to check out prospective universities. But when her overbearing police chief father (Martin Lawrence) insists on escorting her instead in hopes to sway her decision, soon finds her dream trip has turned into a nightmare adventure full of comical misfortune and turmoil. In its opening weekend, the film grossed approximately $14,000,000 in 2,706 theaters in the United States and Canada, ranking as the No. 2 film at box office. It went on to gross more than $60,000,000 worldwide. From 2008 to 2014, she provided the voice of the character Iridessa, the light-fairy, as a part of the Disney Fairies franchise and direct-to-DVD Tinker Bell film series. She appeared in Chris Rock's 2009 documentary Good Hair.

In 2010, Raven-Symoné starred alongside Joanna Garcia in an ABC Family film titled Revenge of the Bridesmaids. The film chronicles two childhood friends who attempt to thwart the wedding of a no-good, money-hungry ex-friend by going undercover as bridesmaids so that true love can prevail. The film garnered 2.5 million viewers on its premiere, making it the number 1 movie on basic cable in women 18–34, and ranked among the Top 5 programs in its time period in Total Viewers that week. 

She also made a guest appearance on the Disney Channel Original Series Sonny with a Chance alongside Demi Lovato. She portrayed the character Amber Algoode, the president of Chad Dylan Cooper's fan club. She was a guest performer, along with pianist Chau-Giang Thi-Nguyen, and jazz trumpeter and pianist Arturo Sandoval, at the performance of December 9 of Debbie Allen's new dance-theater piece, The Hot Chocolate Nutcracker, at UCLA's Royce Hall. Proceeds from the performance, as well as from its run from December 10–11, benefited the children of the Debbie Allen Dance Academy.

In 2011, Raven-Symoné starred in her first television series in four years as the main character of ABC Family's multi-camera comedy pilot State of Georgia. The project, from ABC Studios, centers on her character named Georgia, an exuberant and curvy performer from the south who is trying to make it big as an actress in New York City. The pilot was written by author Jennifer Weiner (In Her Shoes) and Jeff Greenstein (Desperate Housewives). The series premiered in June 2011. The season concluded August 17, 2011 with twelve episodes, and ABC Family cancelled the show on September 16, 2011.

2012–present: Broadway debut and television focus 
On January 31, 2012, it was confirmed that the actress would be in the Broadway musical Sister Act as Deloris van Cartier, marking her Broadway debut in a lead role. Her run started on March 27, 2012. Her contracted final performance coincided with the closure of the show on Broadway on August 26, 2012.

In 2013, she filmed a cameo in See Dad Run alongside former Hanging With Mr. Cooper co-star Mark Curry. In early 2014, she began filming Loose, an independent film co-starring Meagan Good, in Mississippi. In February 2015, the first of her appearances was revealed to be a guest appearance on the new Fox series Empire. She also appeared in 2 episodes of the Disney Channel Original Series K.C. Undercover in which she portrayed the character of Simone Devereaux, making this her first appearance on Disney Channel since her guest appearance in Sonny With a Chance back in 2010.

Also in 2015, she began a guest starring role as Rhonda Johnson, the sister of Anthony Anderson's character Andre, on the ABC comedy series Black-ish. In June 2015, Raven-Symoné joined the ABC daytime talk show The View on a permanent basis after she guest hosted on the show multiple times earlier in the year. In June 2015, she starred in the independent film titled A Girl Like Grace, alongside Meagan Good, Garcelle Beauvais, and Romeo Miller. On October 27, 2016, she announced she would leave The View before the end of 2016 to focus on executive producing and starring in a That's So Raven spin-off. The spinoff was revealed to be titled Raven's Home in April 2017, and premiered on July 21, 2017. The series has been renewed for four additional seasons; for her performance, she earned a nomination for a Daytime Emmy Award.

On November 6, 2019, Raven-Symoné competed in season two of The Masked Singer as "Black Widow".

Singing 
In 1992, Raven-Symoné began her singing career at the age of seven, when she signed with MCA Records. She spent that year and the next taking vocal lessons from Missy Elliott. Her debut album, Here's to New Dreams, was released on June 22, 1993, which spawned two singles: "That's What Little Girls Are Made Of" and "Raven Is the Flavor". "That's What Little Girls Are Made Of" reached No. 68 on the Billboard Hot 100. The album however was not successful, and due to low sales, she was dropped from MCA Records in 1995. The album sold over 73,000 copies in the US.

In 1996, Raven-Symoné and her father founded RayBlaze Records, in which she signed a distribution deal with Crash Records for her second album Undeniable, which was released in May 1999. The album sold over 2,000 in US. The album yielded one single: a cover of Stevie Wonder's "With a Child's Heart". To support the album Undeniable, she went on tour as the opening act for fellow Jive artist 'N Sync's The 'N Sync Tour in 1998/1999.

In 2003, she recorded the classic Stevie Wonder song "Superstition" as the main theme for the film The Haunted Mansion. She signed a deal with Hollywood Records, a Disney-owned label.The following year, she released a five-track EP with Hollywood Records on January 1, 2004 containing the songs “Backflip", "Bump", "Overloved", "What Is Love?", and "Mystify". Released to promote the full-length album, the EP was only available in select stores and is now very rare. On September 21, 2004, she released her third studio album, This Is My Time, which included the single "Backflip". It received heavy rotation on Disney Channel and premiered on BET via an Access Granted special. This Is My Time debuted at number 50 on the U.S. Billboard Top R&B/Hip-Hop Albums chart and at number fifty-one on the official Billboard 200. It had moderately successful first week sales of 19,000 copies (best debut in the chart to date), making it Raven-Symoné's first album to enter the charts in the United States. It was in the top 100 for thirteen weeks, selling about 235,000 copies up to February 2, 2007, according to Nielsen SoundScan. The four songs from the album were incorporated into soundtracks from Disney films: The Lion King 1½ ("Grazing in the Grass"); The Princess Diaries 2: Royal Engagement ("This Is My Time"); Ice Princess ("Bump"); and Go Figure ("Life Is Beautiful"). In the same year, she also recorded music for That's So Ravens first original television soundtrack. The soundtrack debuted and peaked at No. 44 on the Billboard 200 and is now certified Gold by the RIAA for sales of 500,000 copies.

After the success of her third album, This Is My Time (2004), Crash Records sold their rights to the material on Undeniable to TMG Records, who in cooperation with RayBlaize and her then-current label Hollywood Records, re-released it on October 31, 2006, as From Then Until. The re-release included the music video for "With A Child's Heart" as well as some behind-the-scenes footage and live performances. The album sold over 8,000 in US. In support of her third studio album and the That's So Raven Too! soundtrack, which was the second soundtrack album from the series. Raven-Symoné embarked on her first headlining tour. The This Is My Time Tour kicked off on May 19, 2006, in Richmond, VA and concluded on October 21, 2006, in Columbia, SC.

Symone recorded music for That's So Raven Too!s second original television soundtrack. The soundtrack debuted and peaked at No. 44 on the Billboard 200 and selling about 200,000 copies up to April 2007, according to Nielsen SoundScan. The album contains five new songs written and sung by Raven, includes the single, Some Call It Magic, friendship songs like "Friends" with Anneliese van der Pol, there are also collaborations with Orlando Brown for "Little by Little" and Kyle Massey for "Let's Stick Together". The film's soundtrack, The Cheetah Girls 2, debuted at No. 5 on the Billboard Top 200 and is certified for Platinum sales by the RIAA for sales of 1.3 million copies. This soundtrack contained three unreleased songs their soils and seven other songs as part of the group The Cheetah Girls.

Her fourth studio album Raven-Symoné was released on April 29, 2008. The album features production by Sean Garrett (Beyoncé), The JAM (Leona Lewis), Knightwritaz, and The Clutch (Timbaland, Ciara). The only single released was "Double Dutch Bus", a cover of Frankie Smith's 1981 funk track. The single was released to radio on February 9, while the video was released on February 18, 2008. The album debuted at No. 159 on Billboards Top 200. To promote the album she planned to headline her first all-arena tour "The Pajama Party Tour" in Spring 2008, but due to what promoters call "unforeseen difficulties" the tour was postponed until further notice. During her 2008 Summer tour, it was officially announced that after completing her two-CD deal with Hollywood Records, she would not renew her contract with the label.
In late 2009, Raven-Symoné announced that she would return to the studio to record her next album. She said that the album will be "R&B, most definitely.....with an alternative base for the lyrics". She said, "It's good to go out there and spread your wings and find new talent and work with people you haven't worked with before. I'd love to find the next Timbaland or the next someone who's coming up and no one really knows yet. At the same time, I'd love to work with the Clutch and the J.A.M. again".

In January 2011, she told to OnTheRedCarpet.com that she has been working on her fifth album. Da Beat Kadetz formerly known as The TriGz may be working on the project, with Manny Streetz (from Da Beat Kadetz) as executive producer. Raven revealed to Billboard that she would like to work with Sean Garrett again and that it will be R&B with an "alternative base for lyrics". In an interview with Broadway.com in March 2012, she confirmed that she has no plans to release a new album, saying that she "couldn't quite get it together" and that the music she had been working on "wasn't going to be something sellable." She added that the album "might come later in life when I'm able to say what I need to say."

In May 2016, she released two new tracks via online streaming, "Sarafina" and "Cruise Control". It was the first time in eight years she released new music since her self-titled project in 2008.

Raven-Symoné released the single "Spacetruck" and the extended play InfraSounds under her mononym, Raven (stylized in all caps), in April 2020. She is set to release a studio album titled The Reintroduction.

Personal life
In August 2013, Raven-Symoné commented on the legalization of same-sex marriage, stating that she was "excited to hear today that more states legalized gay marriage" and that it was "great to know [she] can now, should [she] wish to." In an October 2014 interview with Oprah Winfrey, she explained her rejection of labeling herself and of identifying as either African-American or gay, specifying that she was an "American" and a "human who loves humans." She was named Grand Marshal of the 2016 Montreal Pride Parade.

Raven-Symoné was in a relationship with model and actress AzMarie Livingston from 2012 to 2015. In June 2020, she married social media manager Miranda Maday.

In 2013, she briefly retired from acting and enrolled at Academy of Art University to pursue an associate degree in fine arts, which she completed in 2016. She came out of retirement in 2015 as a co-host of The View. In the 2016 presidential election, she endorsed Libertarian nominee Gary Johnson.

Filmography

Film

Television

Discography 

Here's to New Dreams (1993)
 Undeniable (1999)
 This Is My Time (2004)
 Raven-Symoné (2008)

Tours
 This Is My Time Tour (2006)
 Live in Concert Tour (20082009)

Awards and nominations 

Symoné's accolades include five NAACP Image Awards, two Kids' Choice Awards, three Young Artist Awards, and three Daytime Emmy Award nominations.

See also

 LGBT culture in New York City

References

External links

 
 

 
1985 births
Living people
20th-century American actresses
20th-century American singers
20th-century American women singers
21st-century American actresses
21st-century American singers
21st-century American women singers
Academy of Art University alumni
Actresses from Atlanta
Actresses from New York City
American child actresses
American child singers
American contemporary R&B singers
American dance musicians
American women pop singers
American film actresses
American hip hop singers
American soul singers
American television actresses
American voice actresses
American women television producers
The Cheetah Girls members
Hollywood Records artists
LGBT people from Georgia (U.S. state)
LGBT people from New York (state)
American LGBT singers
MCA Records artists
Musicians from Atlanta
Singers from New York City
Songwriters from Georgia (U.S. state)
Television producers from New York City
Walt Disney Records artists
American television talk show hosts
American lesbian actresses
American women hip hop singers
American lesbian musicians